This article is a list of events in the year 2003 in Mauritania.

Incumbents
 President: Maaouya Ould Sid'Ahmed Taya
 Prime Minister: 
Cheikh El Avia Ould Mohamed Khouna
Sghair Ould M'Bareck

Events
September 19: The Maritime delimitation treaty between Mauritania and Cape Verde was signed

Sports
ASC Nasr de Sebkha won the Ligue 1 Mauritania football championship

References

 
2000s in Mauritania
Years of the 21st century in Mauritania
Mauritania
Mauritania